Troszyn may refer to:
Troszyn, Masovian Voivodeship (east-central Poland)
Troszyn, Gryfino County in West Pomeranian Voivodeship (north-west Poland)
Troszyn, Kamień County in West Pomeranian Voivodeship (north-west Poland)
 Troszyn Polski

See also
Nowy Troszyn, a village in the administrative district of Gmina Gąbin, Płock County, Masovian Voivodeship, east-central Poland